John Cooper, Baron Cooper of Stockton Heath (7 June 1908 – 2 September 1988) was a British Labour Party politician and trade union leader.

At the 1950 general election, he was elected as Member of Parliament for Deptford, but stood down from the House of Commons at the 1951 general election.

From 1961 to 1973 he was general secretary of the National Union of General and Municipal Workers.

On 11 July 1966, he was made a life peer as Baron Cooper of Stockton Heath, of Stockton Heath in the County Palatine of Chester.

References

External links 
 

1908 births
1988 deaths
Labour Party (UK) MPs for English constituencies
General Secretaries of the GMB (trade union)
Cooper, Jack
UK MPs who were granted peerages
Labour Party (UK) life peers
Life peers created by Elizabeth II
Members of London County Council
Presidents of the GMB (trade union)
Presidents of the Trades Union Congress